Charles Woodhull House is a historic home located on 70 West Main Street (NY Route 25A) in Huntington in Suffolk County, New York. It was built in 1870 and is a -story, three-bay clapboard residence with a low gable roof and brick foundation.  It features a cupola and paired interior end chimneys.  The entrance features a shed-roofed front porch supported by slender paired Doric order columns.

It was added to the National Register of Historic Places in 1985. The house is currently commercial real estate and has various professional tenants occupying the beautiful office suites.  Richtberg and Rehberger Realty Co., LLC, is the property manager for this historical professional office building.

References

Houses on the National Register of Historic Places in New York (state)
Houses completed in 1870
Houses in Suffolk County, New York
National Register of Historic Places in Huntington (town), New York